Syrnolininae is a subfamily of minute parasitic sea snails, marine heterobranch gastropod molluscs in the family Pyramidellidae, the pyrams and their allies.

Taxonomy
According to the taxonomy of Ponder & Lindberg (1997), this was one of eleven recognised subfamilies in the family Pyramidellidae.

In the taxonomy of Bouchet & Rocroi (2005), this subfamily also comprises the subfamily Tiberiinae, downgraded to the rank of tribe Tiberiini.

Subfamily Syrnolinae Saurin, 1958
Tribe Syrnolini Saurin, 1958
Tribe Tiberiini Saurin, 1958 - formerly subfamily Tiberiinae

Genera
Genera in the subfamily Syrnolinae include:

tribe Syrnolini
 Adelactaeon Cossmann, 1895 : now belongs to the family Amathinidae
 Agatha A. Adams, 1860
 Amathis A. Adams, 1861
 Colsyrnola Iredale, 1829
 Costosyrnola Laws, 1937
 Cricocolphus Weisbord, 1962
 Derjuginella Habe, 1958
 Iphiana Dall & Bartsch, 1904
 Adelactaeon Saurin, 1958
 Orinella Dall & Bartsch, 1904
 Pachysyrnola Cossmann, 1907
 Ptycheulimella Sacco, 1892
 Puposyrnola Cossmann, 1921
 Rissosyrnola Nomura, 1939
 Stylopsis A. Adams, 1860
 Styloptygma A. Adams, 1860
 Syrnola A. Adams, 1860 - the type genus of the tribe Syrnolini
 Syrnolina Dall & Bartsch, 1904
 Tibersyrnola Laws, 1937
 Tropaeas Dall & Bartsch, 1904

tribe Tiberiini
 Tiberia Monterosato, 1875 - There is only one genus in the tribe Tiberiini.

References

Pyramidellidae